Cure for Pain is the second studio album by alternative rock band Morphine, released through Rykodisc in September 1993. Jerome Deupree, the band's original drummer, quit due to health problems during the recording of the album and was replaced by Billy Conway.

The tracks "Sheila" and "In Spite of Me" were prominently featured on the soundtrack of the 1994 independent film Spanking the Monkey. The video for "Thursday" also appeared on an episode of Beavis and Butt-head.
The track "Buena" also appears in the first season of The Sopranos and in the Daria episode "The Teachings of Don Jake".
In 2014, the album placed eighth on the Alternative Nation site's "Top 10 Underrated '90s Alternative Rock Albums" list.

As of 1995, it has sold 107,000 copies in United States and over 300,000 copies worldwide. As of 2017, combined sales of Cure for Pain and 1995's Yes are 661,000 sold copies in United States.

Track listing

Japanese edition bonus track

2021 vinyl expanded edition 
In December 2021, the Run Out Groove label released a vinyl-only edition of Cure for Pain, which included a bonus record of unreleased and new-to-vinyl-rarities, all remastered from the original source tapes.

 side one (1-7) and two (8-13) as per original album

Personnel
Morphine
 Mark Sandman – vocals, 2-string slide bass, tritar, guitar, organ
 Dana Colley – baritone saxophone, tenor saxophone, backing vocals (8, 10)
 Jerome Deupree – drums
 Billy Conway – drums (9, 11), cocktail drum overdub (8)
Additional musicians
 Jimmy Ryan – mandolin (7)
 Ken Winokur – percussion (13)
Technical
Paul Q. Kolderie – producer (2–6, 8–10, 12), engineer (2–6, 8–10, 12), mixing (2–6, 8–10, 12)
Mark Sandman – producer (1, 7, 11, 13), engineer (1, 7, 11, 13), mixing (1, 7, 11, 13), photography (color pictures) 
Steve Folsom – engineer (11)
Toby Mountain – mastering
Robin Spencer – design
Cindy Bortman – photography (black and white pictures)
Dennis Stein – photography (bass picture)
Recorded and mixed at Fort Apache, Cambridge, MA., except tracks 1, 7, 11 and 13 recorded and mixed at Hi-N-Dry, Cambridge, MA., and tracks 4 and 9 mixed at Q Division, Somerville, MA.
Bonus tracks
Larry Dersch – drums on "Mile High"
Russ Gershon – tenor saxophone on "Mile High" and "Bo's Veranda"
Tom Halter – trumpet on "Mile High"
Mike Rivard – bass on "Bo's Veranda"
Sabine Hrechdakian – vocals on "Down Love's Tributaries"
Rick Barry – percussion on "My Brain"

Charts

References

External links
Rykodisc: Cure for Pain

1993 albums
Morphine (band) albums
Albums produced by Paul Q. Kolderie
Rykodisc albums